In mathematics, theta functions are special functions of several complex variables. They show up in many topics, including Abelian varieties, moduli spaces, quadratic forms, and solitons. As Grassmann algebras, they appear in quantum field theory.

The most common form of theta function is that occurring in the theory of elliptic functions. With respect to one of the complex variables (conventionally called ), a theta function has a property expressing its behavior with respect to the addition of a period of the associated elliptic functions, making it a quasiperiodic function. In the abstract theory this quasiperiodicity comes from the cohomology class of a line bundle on a complex torus, a condition of descent.

One interpretation of theta functions when dealing with the heat equation is that "a theta function is a special function that describes the evolution of temperature on a segment domain subject to certain boundary conditions".

Jacobi theta function

There are several closely related functions called Jacobi theta functions, and many different and incompatible systems of notation for them. 
It is given by the formula

It is a Jacobi form. The restriction ensures that it is an absolutely convergent series. Accordingly, the theta function is 1-periodic in :

Thus, in general,

It is in fact the most general entire function with 2 quasi-periods, in the following sense:

Auxiliary functions

The Jacobi theta function defined above is sometimes considered along with three auxiliary theta functions, in which case it is written with a double 0 subscript:

The auxiliary (or half-period) functions are defined by

In Jacobi's notation the -functions are written:

The above definitions of the Jacobi theta functions are by no means unique. See Jacobi theta functions (notational variations) for further discussion.

If we set  in the above theta functions, we obtain four functions of  only, defined on the upper half-plane. Alternatively, we obtain four functions of  only, defined on the unit disk . They are sometimes called theta constants:

with the nome . 
Observe that . 
These can be used to define a variety of modular forms, and to parametrize certain curves; in particular, the Jacobi identity is

or equivalently,

which is the Fermat curve of degree four.

Jacobi identities
For the second, let

Then

Theta functions in terms of the nome
In this form, the functions become

These formulas can, therefore, be used to define the Theta functions over other fields where the exponential function might not be everywhere defined, such as fields of -adic numbers.

Product representations

It can be proven by elementary means, as for instance in Hardy and Wright's An Introduction to the Theory of Numbers.

If we express the theta function in terms of the nome  (noting some authors instead set )  and take  then

We therefore obtain a product formula for the theta function in the form

Expanding terms out, the Jacobi triple product can also be written

which we may also write as

This form is valid in general but clearly is of particular interest when  is real. Similar product formulas for the auxiliary theta functions are

In particular, so we may interpret them as one-parameter deformations of the periodic functions , again validating the interpretation of the theta function as the most general 2 quasi-period function.

Integral representations
The Jacobi theta functions have the following integral representations:

Explicit values

Lemniscatic values 

Proper credit for most of these results goes to Ramanujan. See Ramanujan's lost notebook and a relevant reference at Euler function.  The Ramanujan results quoted at Euler function plus a few elementary operations give the results below, so they are either in Ramanujan's lost notebook or follow immediately from it. See also Yi (2004). Define,

with the nome   and Dedekind eta function  Then for 

Note that the following modular identities hold:

where  is the Rogers–Ramanujan continued fraction:

Equianharmonic values 
The mathematician Bruce Berndt found out further values of the theta function:

Further values 
Many values of the theta function and especially of the shown phi function can be represented in terms of the gamma function:

Some series identities

The next two series identities were proved by István Mező:

These relations hold for all .

Zeros of the Jacobi theta functions
All zeros of the Jacobi theta functions are simple zeros and are given by the following:

where ,  are arbitrary integers.

Relation to the Riemann zeta function
The relation

was used by Riemann to prove the functional equation for the Riemann zeta function, by means of the Mellin transform

Relation to the Weierstrass elliptic function
The theta function was used by Jacobi to construct (in a form adapted to easy calculation) his elliptic functions as the quotients of the above four theta functions, and could have been used by him to construct Weierstrass's elliptic functions also, since

Relation to the q-gamma function

The fourth theta function – and thus the others too – is intimately connected to the Jackson -gamma function via the relation

Relations to Dedekind eta function
Let  be the Dedekind eta function, and the argument of the theta function as the nome . Then,

and,

See also the Weber modular functions.

Elliptic modulus
The elliptic modulus is

and the complementary elliptic modulus is

A solution to the heat equation
The Jacobi theta function is the fundamental solution of the one-dimensional heat equation with spatially periodic boundary conditions.

which solves the heat equation

.

Relation to the Heisenberg group
The Jacobi theta function is invariant under the action of a discrete subgroup of the Heisenberg group. This invariance is presented in the article on the theta representation of the Heisenberg group.

Generalizations

with the sum extending over the lattice of integers . This theta function is a modular form of weight  (on an appropriately defined subgroup) of the modular group.  In the Fourier expansion,

the numbers  are called the representation numbers of the form.

Theta series of a Dirichlet character

For  a primitive Dirichlet character modulo  and  then 

 

is a weight  modular form of level  and character

which means

 

whenever

Ramanujan theta function

Riemann theta function
Let

the set of symmetric square matrices whose imaginary part is positive definite.  is called the Siegel upper half-space and is the multi-dimensional analog of the upper half-plane. The -dimensional analogue of the congruence subgroups is played by

Then, given , the Riemann theta function is defined as

Here,  is an -dimensional complex vector, and the superscript T denotes the transpose. One major application of the Riemann theta function is that it allows one to give explicit formulas for meromorphic functions on compact Riemann surfaces, as well as other auxiliary objects that figure prominently in their function theory, by taking  to be the period matrix with respect to a canonical basis for its first homology group.

The functional equation is

Poincaré series
The Poincaré series generalizes the theta series to automorphic forms with respect to arbitrary Fuchsian groups.

Theta function coefficients

Notes

References

. (for treatment of the Riemann theta)

 (history of Jacobi's  functions)

Further reading

 
Harry Rauch with Hershel M. Farkas: Theta functions with applications to Riemann Surfaces, Williams and Wilkins, Baltimore MD 1974, .

External links

 
Elliptic functions
Riemann surfaces
Analytic functions
Several complex variables